Scum Lake is a lake in the Chilcotin region of the Interior of British Columbia, Canada.

The major inflow, at the west, and outflow, at the northeast, is Haines Creek, which flows to the Chilcotin River near the settlement of Hanceville. The Chilcotin River flows via the Fraser River to the Pacific Ocean.

Scum Lake Airport is at the northeastern tip of the lake.

References

Lakes of British Columbia
Lillooet Land District